The Oxford and Cambridge Musical Club was founded in London in 1899 as a residential Club for Gentlemen. At the club's foundation, it was open (principally) to past and present members of the Universities of Oxford and Cambridge. The club's original purpose was the performance of chamber music but expanded over the years to include solo instrumental music, vocal music, orchestral music and opera. Its first premises were at 47 Leicester Square but from 1914 to 1940 the club was situated at 6 Bedford Square. Ladies were first admitted in 1938. After 1940 the club ceased to be a residential club.

Today the club provides music-making activities in central London with membership open to all. It has an association with the University College London Chamber Music Club but no longer maintains connections with the universities of Oxford and Cambridge.

Club history 
The heyday of the club in its original form was from 1900 to 1940 and many famous musicians, politicians and artists of the day were members. The first President of the Club was Dr. Joseph Joachim, the violinist and friend of the composer Brahms. At the establishment of the Club, a number of prominent people were invited to become honorary members, including the Prime Minister Arthur Balfour - who succeeded Joachim as Club President, composers Sir Hubert Parry and Sir Alexander Mackenzie and the conductor Hans Richter.

The Club Archives are held at the Bodleian Library Department of Special Collections in Oxford. An electronic archive of concert programmes from March 1922 onwards is maintained on the Club's website.

Distinguished former members and honorary members 
Hugh Percy Allen
Richard Armstrong
Anthony Asquith
Lennox Berkeley
Adrian Boult
John Dykes Bower
Frederick Bridge
Percy Buck
George Butterworth
Walter Willson Cobbett
Walford Davies
Désiré Defauw
Thomas Dunhill
Edward Elgar
Gervase Elwes
Frederic Alfred d'Erlanger
Edmund Fellowes
E. M. Forster
Freddie Grisewood
Patrick Hadley
Ernest Markham Lee
Compton Mackenzie
Neville Marriner
Ernest John Moeran
Boris Ord
Walter Parratt
Harold Rutland
Percy Scholes
Geoffrey Shaw
Heathcote Dicken Statham
Lytton Strachey
Lionel Tertis
Donald Tovey
William Walton

References

External links 
 The Oxford and Cambridge Musical Club

Music organisations based in the United Kingdom
Gentlemen's clubs in London
1899 establishments in England
Musical groups established in 1899
Music in London